Volume 8 is the eighth album of Banda Calypso. It was the biggest selling album of the band to date, it has many successes and its impact on the media was very strong. The album features songs from hits like Isso é Calypso, Tchau Pra Você, Pra Me Conquistar, Esqueça Meu Coração and others.

Content 
The disc more feminist songs like Tchau Pra Você and Esqueça Meu Coração, where Joelma sings about decided women and determined that no they accept the situation they are living. A highlight was the much talked about band Um Novo Ser, which deals with the difficulties of the world and how the person wants to be able to improve and asks the God a chance to be born in itself a new being. A Bruno's composition of the double Bruno & Marrone, the song Nem Sim, Nem Não was something very remarkable, and the band rescued something that had in their previous studio album, which were the songs with taken from Lambada, Cumbia, Merengue, among them the single head Isso é Calypso, which also became the second official music video of the band.

Latin Grammys 
The album was named Best regional music album or Brazilian roots but lost to Elba Ramalho.

Repercussion 
In addition to the singles are at various stops, the entire album is considered a commercial success. The disc had national and international success, having sold more than 2 million copies.

Soundtrack 
The song Tô Carente was present on the soundtrack of the film Ó Paí, Ó,, starring Lázaro Ramos.

Track listing

Chart performance

Certification

References

2005 albums
Portuguese-language albums
Banda Calypso albums